John W. Burton is the name of:

 John William Burton (born 1845), New Zealand entrepreneur in Burton Brothers photography chain
 John Wear Burton (1915–2010), Australian diplomat and academic
 John W. Burton (film producer) (1906–1978), American film producer and cinematographer

See also
John Burton (disambiguation)